Chai Wan Ferry Pier (1965–1986) was a ferry pier in Chai Wan, Hong Kong, near the current Chai Wan Industrial City.

History 
Chai Wan Ferry Pier started operation in 1965 and provided ferry services to Central and Kwun Tong respectively, but the services were cancelled soon because of insufficient passenger numbers. Until the 1980s, the Hongkong and Yaumati Ferry reopened the ferry services. The pier was closed in 1986 after the Island Eastern Corridor and MTR Island line were opened. It now handles cargo and supports the annual dragon boat race.

References

Demolished piers in Hong Kong
1965 establishments in Hong Kong
1986 disestablishments in Hong Kong
Chai Wan
Victoria Harbour